So Let Five Years Pass, also known as If Five Years Pass and When Five Years Have Passed, is a play by the 20th-century Spanish dramatist Federico García Lorca. It was written in 1931 but was not given a professional theatrical production until several years after Lorca's death, despite plans to stage it in 1936. It was produced in an English-language translation at the Provincetown Playhouse in New York in April 1945. It received its Spanish-language première in 1954 at the University of Puerto Rico. In September 1978 it opened at the Teatro Eslava in Madrid.

The critic for ABC, Lorenzo López Sancho, wrote in his review of the Madrid production: "It seems to me that in When Five Years Pass we see the true depth of the great theatrical personality that García Lorca would have become and, probably, his most original and experimental contribution to the theatre."

Works cited
 Edwards, Gwynne. 1980. Lorca: The Theatre Beneath the Sand. London and New York: Marion Boyars. .
The play was directed by Victoria Espinosa in its premiere in 1954 at the University of Puerto Rico.

References

Plays by Federico García Lorca
1931 plays